Sorapiss, also referred to as Sorapis or Punta Sorapiss, is a mountain in the Dolomites within the Veneto region of northern Italy. In its vicinity is a mountain pass of the same name, as well as Sorapiss Lake (Lago di Sorapiss), at the foot of the mountain. The mountain range is part of the "Natural Park of the Ampezzo Dolomites".

Description

The limestone dolomite formations, which are irregular, rugged and sharp-edged peaks, are part of the Eastern Alps. The Cristallo group lies to the north past the Passo Tre Croci, and its southern neighbour is the Antelao.

The mountain has three ridges: a central ridge, a southern ridge, which is the part of the mountain that can be seen from Cortina, and, beyond a high pass and little to the west, a northern ridge that culminates in the skiing area of Mount Faloria. There are three glaciers on the mountain's slopes, although these have been melting considerably in recent years. Lago Sorapiss, at the foot of the mountain, is a glacial lake at an elevation .

History

Rifugio Alfonso Vandelli was built by Austrians in 1891 on the banks of Lago di Sorapiss. In 1895 it was destroyed by an avalanche, but was rebuilt the following year in a more sheltered spot. At the end of World War I in 1918, Cortina d'Ampezzo became part of the Kingdom of Italy (1918) and the refuge became the property of the CAI (Club Alpino Italiano) of Venice. In 1924, thanks to a donation by Cesare Luigi Luzzati, a new refuge was built. A fire destroyed it completely in 1959, and it was again reconstructed; the current shelter was opened on 18 September 1966 and was named after the president of the CAI of Venice, Alfonso Vandelli.

Paul Grohmann made the first ascent of the mountain in September 1864, taking 8 hours and 30 minutes. There are at least two routes to the summit: the Grohmann-Weg, which crosses the mountain's west flank, joining the S. Vito route near the summit, and the Muller-Weg, which traverses the east glacier and ascends direct over the precipices on the northeast side.

Flora
The flora on Sorapiss includes Festucetum pulchellae (slopes), Euphrasio-Globularietum (base), and Drabetum hoppeanae (on the range).

Legend

There is a legend associated with the name of Sorapiss, which in local dialect means "above the waterfall". A "peace-loving" king named Sorapiss turned himself into a rocky mountain during a course of unexpected events. A witch had bewitched the king's impulsive daughter Misurina by promising her a magical mirror as a reward for providing shade to her house. This was honoured by her doting father, who turned himself into a mountain. At a later date, Misurina, demonstrating a sense of gratitude towards her father, cried and shed tears which formed the Lago di Sorapiss at the foot of the large cliff of Sorapiss, the immobilized form of her father.

References

Sources

Further reading

External links

Mountains of the Alps
Alpine three-thousanders
Dolomites
Mountains of Veneto
Geography of Cortina d'Ampezzo